WJIT (1250 AM) is a radio station broadcasting a Spanish Tropical format. It is licensed to Sabana, Puerto Rico, and is owned by Aurio A. Matos Barreto. The station shares with translator stations W267DD (101.3 FM) in Vega Baja and W279BU (103.7 FM) in San Juan and simulcasts on WZCA (91.7 FM) in Quebradillas.

Cima Radio Network

WJIT is the flagship station of the Cima Radio Network. WJIT's programming is also heard on WZCA 91.7 FM in Quebradillas.

Translator stations

References

External links

JIT
Radio stations established in 2000
2000 establishments in Puerto Rico
Vega Alta, Puerto Rico